Adelaide Alexander Sink (born June 5, 1948) is an American politician and financier. A member of the Democratic Party, Sink was the Chief Financial Officer for the state of Florida and treasurer on the board of trustees of the Florida State Board of Administration. She was the Democratic nominee for Governor of Florida and faced Republican nominee Rick Scott in the 2010 Florida gubernatorial election, losing to Scott by a 1% margin. Sink was also the unsuccessful Democratic nominee in the 2014 special election for Florida's 13th congressional district, losing to Republican David Jolly on March 11, 2014, in a race to fill the vacancy created by the death in 2013 of U.S. Representative Bill Young.

Personal life
Sink was born and raised in Mount Airy, North Carolina, the daughter of Adelaide A. (née Bunker) and Kester A. Sink. Her maternal great-grandfather was Chang Bunker, one of the famous conjoined "Siamese Twins", Chang and Eng Bunker. She is a graduate of Wake Forest University. After graduating with a degree in mathematics, she taught at girls schools in Sierra Leone and Liberia for three years.

Sink is the widow of Florida attorney and politician Bill McBride who was the unsuccessful Democratic nominee for Governor of Florida in 2002, making them the only married American couple to both run unsuccessfully in gubernatorial races. They have a son, Bert, and a daughter, Lexi.

Political career
Sink is a former President of Florida Operations at NationsBank, now Bank of America. She was appointed by former Governor Lawton Chiles to the Commission on Government Accountability to the People, and also served on Chiles' Commission on Education.  She was vice-chair of Florida TaxWatch. Sink has also served with the Florida Chapter of the Nature Conservancy, the Beth El Farm Workers Ministry, and as Chairman of the Board of the United Way of Hillsborough County.

Florida Chief Financial Officer

Sink was the Democratic candidate for Florida's office of Chief Financial Officer in 2006. She defeated Republican Tom Lee 53.5 percent to 46.5 percent.
She also was the first Democrat elected to the state Cabinet since 1998.

Florida Taj Mahal scandal

On August 30, 2010, Sink sent letters to the Florida Supreme Court and Florida Department of Management Services that preliminary findings warranted an audit via her DFS, Bureau of Auditing for excessive spending on the First District Court of Appeal of Florida courthouse, referred to as the "Taj Mahal" by judges around Florida as their districts are facing budget cuts. The CFO's office states that money may have been misused and as much as $16 million may have been spent in a financial raid on the state's Workers' Compensation Trust Fund. A $33.5 million bond for construction was attached to a transportation bill and passed on last day of the 2007 legislative session. There is an ongoing investigation by the CFO's office.

2010 gubernatorial candidate 

Heading into the 2010 cycle, Sink was mentioned as a possible candidate for the U.S. Senate or for Governor of Florida. In 2008, Sink stated that she would "assess the landscape after the first of the year, and make a decision then." In January 2009, Sink announced she would not run for either seat, preferring to stand for reelection as CFO. The announcement that Gov. Charlie Crist would forgo re-election to run for the Senate seat being vacated by Mel Martinez altered her position, and on May 13, 2009, Sink announced her intention to run for governor.

On August 24, 2010, Sink won the Democratic primary for governor. She faced health care executive Rick Scott in the general election, as well as an independent (NPA) candidate, urban designer and policy analyst, Michael E. Arth. A former independent candidate, Bud Chiles, endorsed Sink in September.

On October 25, 2010, during a televised debate, Sink read a text message sent to her make up artist's cellular phone from a campaign official instructing Sink as to debate strategy, contrary to the rules of the debate. Sink fired the adviser who sent the text message.

After a close election, Sink conceded, giving victory to Scott.  He carried 49% of the vote, and she 48%.

2014 campaign for Congress

Republican Bill Young, who had represented the 13th District and its predecessors since 1971, died on October 18, 2013. On October 30, Sink told the Tampa Bay Times that she would run in the special election to replace him. She quickly gained support from national Democratic power brokers. The only other declared Democratic candidate, Jessica Ehrlich, who had faced Young in the 2012 general election, dropped out of the race on November 6, effectively handing the nomination to Sink. She faced David Jolly, Young's former general counsel, in the March 11 election.

A longtime resident of Thonotosassa in eastern Hillsborough County, Sink told the Times that she would move to Pinellas County as soon as possible. Although members of the House are required only to live in the state they represent, it has become a very strong convention that they live in the district they represent. She signed a one-year lease for an apartment near her campaign headquarters in Clearwater to establish residency in the district, with plans to buy a house in the district later.

The 13th and its predecessors had been in Republican hands since William Cramer won the seat in the 1954 election; he was succeeded by Young in 1971.  It had been one of the earliest districts in the South to turn Republican.  It was widely thought that Sink had a chance of winning; Obama had carried the district twice, and Sink had carried the district in her gubernatorial campaign against Scott.     The race was close, with Sink taking 46.6 percent of the vote to Jolly's 48.4 percent.

Political positions

Health care
Sink supported the Patient Protection and Affordable Care Act (H.R. 3020) passed by the United States Congress and enacted on March 30, 2010.

Adoption
Sink believes in the placement of children in a home where it is in the best interests of children regardless of gender preference. She addressed a group of 300 gay and lesbian advocates at the Museum of Art Fort Lauderdale. She said, "We need a system in which all of our children are assured that they live in a healthy, loving home -- a home that's determined not by any law." "The decision has to be made by the judge, in consultation with the experts, to determine what is the best for that individual child."

Post-political career
Since her two unsuccessful electoral campaigns, Sink has become involved in mentoring tech startups in the Tampa Bay area. On whether she would run for public office again, she said "I've learned to never say never, but I don't think it will happen."

Alex and Bill worked together to launch the Florida Next Foundation in 2011 - a non-profit, non-partisan policy foundation.

Electoral history

References

|-

 

1948 births
21st-century American politicians
21st-century American women politicians
American educators
American politicians of Chinese descent
American people of Thai descent
American Presbyterians
American women of Chinese descent in politics
Asian-American people in Florida politics
Bank of America executives
Candidates in the 2010 United States elections
Chief Financial Officers of Florida
Florida Democrats
Living people
People from Clearwater, Florida
People from Hillsborough County, Florida
People from Mount Airy, North Carolina
Wake Forest University alumni
Women in Florida politics